Ultimate Alabama: 20 #1 Hits is a compilation album by American country music band Alabama, released in 2004.

The album debuted at No. 52 on the Billboard 200, and No. 10 on Top Country Albums in its first week of release.  The album has sold 755,100 copies in the United States as of April 2017.

Track listing

Charts

Weekly charts

Year-end charts

References

2004 compilation albums
Alabama (band) compilation albums
RCA Records compilation albums